Keir S. Thomas (born January 25, 1998) is an American football outside linebacker for the Los Angeles Rams of the National Football League (NFL). He played college football at South Carolina and Florida State.

Early life and education
Thomas was born on January 25, 1998, in Miami, Florida. He attended Miami Central Senior High School where he played nose guard, defensive end, defensive tackle and linebacker. He was a PrepStar All-American and recorded 71 tackles and 18 sacks as a junior, while making 22 sacks and 83 tackles as a senior. Rivals.com ranked him the 49th-best player in Florida and the 23rd-best strongside defensive end nationally. He was a first-team Class 6A all-state player and was named the Miami Herald 8A-6A defensive player of the year.

Thomas committed to the University of South Carolina and enrolled in January 2016. As a true freshman he appeared in all 13 games and started two, while recording 24 tackles and two sacks. In 2017, as a sophomore, Thomas started 11 out of 13 games and was credited with 38 tackles and two sacks while playing defensive end as well in the interior of the defensive line. His coach described him as being "invaluable" to the team.

As a junior, Thomas played both defensive tackle and defensive end, starting 12 games making 44 tackles along with 1.5 sacks. In the 2019 fall camp, as a senior, Thomas suffered an ankle injury which resulted in an infection, keeping him out for almost the entire season. He appeared in only two games as a redshirt, recording four tackles. After the season finished, he was named one of six winners of the Dr. Harris Pastides Outstanding Student-Athlete Award.

Thomas was one of the Gamecocks' top defensive linemen in the 2020 season, recording 32 tackles along with three sacks despite battling injuries from the prior year. In January 2021, he announced his intention to transfer. He committed to Florida State shortly afterwards. In one season for Florida State, Thomas started all 12 games and made 42 tackles, including 12 for-loss, as well as 6.5 sacks and 15 quarterback hurries. He was named team captain and was selected to the All-ACC third-team.

Professional career
Thomas was not invited to the NFL Combine and went unselected in the 2022 NFL Draft. On May 1, 2022, he was signed by the Los Angeles Rams as an undrafted free agent. He impressed in training camp, and posted a strong performance in the final preseason game which led to him being one of three undrafted rookies to make the Rams' final roster. He made his NFL debut in week one of the regular season, appearing on one defensive snap and 11 special teams snaps in the Rams' 10–31 loss to the Buffalo Bills. He was waived on September 22, and re-signed to the practice squad two days later. He was promoted to the active roster on December 3, 2022.

References

External links
 Los Angeles Rams bio
 Florida State Seminoles bio

1998 births
Living people
American football defensive ends
American football defensive tackles
Sportspeople from Miami
South Carolina Gamecocks football players
Florida State Seminoles football players
Los Angeles Rams players